Yazid Moeen Hasan Abu Layla (born 8 January 1993) is a Jordanian footballer who plays as a goalkeeper for Saudi Arabian side Al-Jabalain on loan from Al-Faisaly.

On 27 January 2023, Abu Layla joined Saudi Arabian club Al-Jabalain on loan.

International career
Abu Layla played his first international match against Iraq in an international friendly in Basra on 1 June 2017, which Jordan lost 1–0.

International career statistics

References

External links
 
 eurosport.com
 11v11.com
 

Jordanian footballers
Jordan international footballers
Association football goalkeepers
Jordanian Pro League players
Saudi First Division League players
Shabab Al-Ordon Club players
Al-Faisaly SC players
Al-Jabalain FC players
1993 births
Living people
Jordanian expatriate footballers
Expatriate footballers in Saudi Arabia
Jordanian expatriate sportspeople in Saudi Arabia